Oleg Arnoldovich Amirbayov (born December 16, 1986) is an Azerbaijani theatre and film actor, TV host, and journalist of Russian descent.

Life 
Oleg Arnoldovich Amirbayov was born on December 16, 1986, in Baku, then capital of Azerbaijani SSR, one of the soviet socialist republics of the USSR. Both of his parents were Merited artists of Azerbaijan. His father was Arnold Kharchenko, while his mother was Rita Amirbayova. In 2009 he graduated from Azerbaijan State University of Culture and Arts. Since 2010 Amirbayov works in the Azerbaijan State Russian Drama Theatre. He was also worked in AzTv and Mədəniyyət TV channels as a host. Apart from that, he has worked in the Russian Mir TV channel.

He is married and has a son named Jalil.

References

External links 
 Oleg Arnoldovich Amirbayov in kino-teatr.ru. 

1986 births
21st-century Azerbaijani male actors
Azerbaijani journalists
Azerbaijani people of Russian descent
Azerbaijan State University of Culture and Arts alumni
Living people